Third Eye Blind is an American alternative rock band formed in San Francisco, California, in 1993. The group's discography consists of seven studio albums, one live album, two compilation albums, three extended plays, 25 singles, three promotional singles, and 31 music videos. The current line-up consists of Stephan Jenkins, Brad Hargreaves, Kryz Reid, Colin CreeV, and Alex LeCavalier. They have amassed worldwide album sales of over 12 million units.

After signing with Elektra Records, Third Eye Blind released their self-titled debut album in 1997. Helped by the singles "Semi-Charmed Life", "Graduate", "How's It Going to Be", "Losing a Whole Year", and "Jumper", the album peaked at number 25 on the Billboard 200 chart, sold six million copies, and went six times platinum in the United States. "Semi-Charmed Life" peaked at number four on the Billboard Hot 100. Their second album, 1999's Blue, included "Anything", "Never Let You Go", "10 Days Late", and "Deep Inside of You". Blue peaked at number 40 and went platinum in the US.

Third Eye Blind released their third album, Out of the Vein, after a three-year hiatus. It peaked at number 12, but only one single from the album ("Blinded") charted, and the album has not been certified. In 2004, the band's record label ceased to exist. They released the compilation album A Collection in 2006 and the extended play Red Star in 2008. In 2009, their fourth studio album, Ursa Major, was released. It peaked at number three in the US but did not have any singles that charted. Their fifth studio album, Dopamine, was released six years later in 2015 and peaked at number 13 in the US. Jenkins announced that the band would cease making full-length albums in favor of making smaller EP releases. In 2016 the band released the EP We Are Drugs, which was followed two years later by Thanks for Everything. Despite Jenkins' previous statement that they wouldn't release any more full-length albums, Third Eye Blind released their sixth album, Screamer, in 2019 and seventh album, Our Bande Apart, in 2021.

Albums

Studio albums

Live albums

Compilation albums

Extended plays

Singles

As lead artist

As featured artist

Promotional singles

Other appearances

Music videos

Notes

References

External links
 
 
 
 

Discographies of American artists
Rock music group discographies
Alternative rock discographies